is a railway station in Moriyama-ku, Nagoya, Aichi Prefecture,  Japan, operated by Meitetsu.

Lines

Station layout
The station has two elevated opposed side platforms with the station building underneath. The station has automated ticket machines, Manaca automated turnstiles and is unattended.

Platforms

Adjacent stations

|-
!colspan=5|Nagoya Railroad

Station history
Hyōtan-yama Station was opened on June 3, 1936, on the privately operated Seto Electric Railway. The Seto Electric Railway was absorbed into the Meitetsu group on September 1, 1939. The station was closed from 1944 to 1946 due to World War 2. The platforms were lengthened in March 1978. A new station building was completed on October 6, 1981, and the station was staffed for the first time. However, with the introduction of the Tranpass system of magnetic fare cards with automatic turnstiles in December 2006, the station has again been unattended.

Passenger statistics
In fiscal 2017, the station was used by an average of 2135 passengers daily.

Surrounding area
 Hyōtanyama Kofun
Moriyama Junior High School

See also
 List of railway stations in Japan

References

External links

 Official web page 

Railway stations in Japan opened in 1936
Railway stations in Aichi Prefecture
Stations of Nagoya Railroad
Railway stations in Nagoya